In business, value process management (VPM) is the management of processes that do with value creation and dissemination throughout the entire organization. This definition bears some commonality with other related terms as process management and business process management but it differentiates itself by being focused entirely on value adding, generating, distributing and presenting to the key stakeholders in the organization. 

VPM can be regarded as the next follow on to business process management (BPM) the same way  BPM was regarded at its time as the follow-on to business process reengineering (BPR) in a continually improving, maturing and evolving journey towards more or less a fixed set of desired performance attributes/outcomes.  This evolution/maturity journey manifests itself by shifting attention from pure technology topics, to business focus as we have seen in the middle nineties onwards.  Taking cultural dimensions into consideration, there is a further shift into premium value topics that are highly regarded by all stakeholders in any organization.

VPM neither claims nor intends to quit the business focus as it may seem at first glance. However, it will try to disengage the 'process' concept from 'business' aspects, and extend the scope and reach of the process management to become focused on what it is most worth i.e. VALUE throughout the organization as perceived and appreciated by the key stakeholders.

Business process management
Theory of value (economics)